The Byrds were an American rock band that were formed in Los Angeles, California in 1964.

The bulk of the band's releases were issued on Columbia Records or its subsidiaries, with a notable exception being their final studio album from 1973. This final album, titled Byrds, and its accompanying singles ("Full Circle", "Things Will Be Better", and "Cowgirl in the Sand") were all released on Asylum Records. In addition, the band released a single under the pseudonym of the Beefeaters in October 1964 on Elektra Records (Pye Records in the UK), before they had signed a recording contract with Columbia.

The Byrds' discography was originally released on the vinyl format, as full-length LPs, shorter EPs, and singles. Since the 1960s, the band's back catalogue has also been released on reel-to-reel tape, audio cassette, 8-track tape, CD, MiniDisc, digital downloads, and, most recently, as streaming media. Between 1965 and 1968, the Byrds' albums were released in both mono and stereo variations, with Sweetheart of the Rodeo being the first album to be released exclusively in stereo in the US (Sweetheart of the Rodeo and its follow-up Dr. Byrds & Mr. Hyde were both issued in mono and stereo formats in the UK).

This article lists all of the Byrds' official studio albums, live albums, compilations, EPs, and singles. Unofficial, "bootleg" releases are not included.

Studio albums

Live albums

Compilation albums 
There have been many official compilation albums by the Byrds released since 1967, with the majority of these collections consisting of material recorded between 1965 and 1971, a period when the band were with Columbia Records. In addition, four compilations of material recorded before the group secured a recording contract with Columbia have been released under the titles Preflyte, In the Beginning, The Preflyte Sessions and Preflyte Plus. Two compilations of rare and previously unissued material have also been released as Never Before and Another Dimension. There have so far been two Byrds' box sets issued: The Byrds (October 1990) and There Is a Season (September 2006). Also, excerpts from the band's performance at the Monterey Pop Festival have been released on The Monterey International Pop Festival CD box set and among the extras on the Monterey Pop DVD.
NOTE: The four compilation albums with the title The Very Best of The Byrds (released in 1983, 1997, 2006, and 2008) are not the same and each features a different track listing.
NOTE: The three compilations titled The Byrds Play Dylan or The Byrds Play the Songs of Bob Dylan (released in 1979, 2001, and 2002) are not the same and each features a different track listing.

Extended plays
CBS Records released two Byrds EPs in the UK during 1966, featuring tracks taken from the band's first three albums. Then, in 1971, Columbia Records and Scholastic Books released an EP in the United States to tie-in with the publication of Bud Scoppa's biography of the Byrds. A further three EPs were released in the UK between 1983 and 1990 on various record labels.

Singles

Notes

References
General

 
 
 
 
 
 
 

Specific

External links
 

Discographies of American artists
Rock music group discographies